Form Grows Rampant is the debut release by Peter Christopherson's solo project The Threshold HouseBoys Choir. The set is a CD + DVD. The album was originally announced in the liner notes of the compilation album X-Rated: The Dark Files as Rampant. The set was originally planned to be released in Blu-ray format. The DVD portion of the set includes documentary footage directed by Peter Christopherson from a vegetarian festival in Krung Thep, Thailand. He has used the video footage during his live performances since the debut concert in Russia. 

An alternate version of "So Young It Knows No Maturing" appears on X-Rated: The Dark Files. "As Doors Open Into Space" is a remix of the song "Mahil Athal Nadrach" from the compilation ...It Just Is.

Select sleeve notes on recording
"All Music and pictures composed, arranged & conducted by Peter Christopherson in the East Tower October 05 - February 07."

Produced & semi-conducted by Danny Hyde. Lightly mastered by Mark Godwin. Photography by Ryota Matsumoto 

All voices from indigenous sources, completely re-styled, re-tuned, and re-arranged, using:
 Ableton Live 6
 Melodyne plug-in
 Auto-Tune5 & Avox Throat

CD Track listing/DVD Chapters

References

discogs.com entry

2007 debut albums
2007 video albums
Documentary films about electronic music and musicians
The Threshold HouseBoys Choir albums